General elections were held in British Guiana on 24 November 1947. The British Guiana Labour Party emerged as the largest party, winning five of the 14 seats. Voter turnout was 71%.

Electoral system
Constitutional changes in 1943 resulted in a 25-member Legislative Council, of which 14 seats were elected, seven held by appointed members and four by members of the appointed Executive Council. The franchise was also changed; with the right to vote was extended to people earning at least $10 a month, although candidates were required to have a monthly income of at least $100. As a result, the electorate increased in size from 9,514 in the 1935 elections to 59,193.

The elections were using fourteen single-member constituencies.

Campaign
The elections were contested by the Manpower Citizens' Association (MPCA), the British Guiana Labour Party (BGLP), as well as 31 independents, who included three members of the Political Affairs Committee (PAC) and one from the Women's Political and Economic Organisation. The BGCP contested 13 of the 14 seats, with the MPCA putting forward seven candidates.

The BGLP campaigned for the introduction of universal suffrage, and creation of a 24-member Legislative Council and self-government within five years, as well as land redistribution and more housebuilding. The MPCA called for the nationalisation of industry and the introduction of land settlement schemes. Grenadian independence campaigner T.A. Marryshow arrived in British Guiana to celebrate the BGLP's anniversary, and also campaigned for the party.

Results

Elected members

Aftermath
Following the elections, the election of Hubert Nathaniel Critchlow in South Georgetown was overturned by an electoral petition that claimed false statements had been made against his opponent Frances Stafford, including that she had kicked an African child and been fined. The subsequent by-election was won by John Carter, who defeated Stafford.

References

Elections in Guyana
1947 in British Guiana
British Guiana
Election and referendum articles with incomplete results
British Guiana
November 1947 events in South America